Caher Island (Cathair na Naomh in Irish), an uninhabited island off the coast of County Mayo in Ireland, is situated between the larger Clare Island and Inishturk.

Etymology 
Cathair na Naomh in Irish means the City of the Saints.

History 

An ancient centre for pilgrimage, it is still visited for this reason today. On 15 August each year, the Feast of the Assumption, there is a pilgrimage to the island.

The island has an Early Christian monastery with the remains of a chapel in an enclosure and several carved slabs. The island appears to hold the remains of hermitages of seventh century monks.

After being widowed in 1565, the legendary pirate queen and Irish clan leader Gráinne Mhaol (Grace O'Malley) allegedly took a shipwrecked sailor as her lover. The affair only lasted briefly as he was killed in a deliberate provocation by Clan MacMahon of Ballyvoy. Seeking vengeance, O'Malley attacked Clan MacMahon's stronghold of Doona Castle in Blacksod Bay and slew her lover's killers upon Caher Island. Her vengeance against Clan MacMahon earned Gráinne Mhaol the sinister nickname the 'Dark Lady of Doona'.

Access to the island 
The island is accessed by boat from Inishturk. Caher can only be accessed reasonably safely by approaching with a small boat, such as a currach, from the east to the point marked as Portatemple on the charts. This is not a safe harbour, as heavy Atlantic swells can break through even on rare calm days. The comment on the chart for the area, "The entire area of irregular depths up to 4 miles offshore between Clew Bay and Killary harbour 10 miles further south, breaks in bad weather" reflects the fact that even in moderate swell conditions of less than 5 metres, peaks can rise and break unexpectedly.

References

See also
Clare Island
Inishturk

Islands of County Mayo
Uninhabited islands of Ireland